The Georgia women's national under-20 basketball team is a national basketball team of Georgia, administered by the Georgian Basketball Federation.
It represents the country in women's international under-20 basketball competitions.

The team finished 18th at the 2022 FIBA U20 Women's European Championship Division B.

See also
Georgia women's national under-18 basketball team
Georgia women's national under-16 basketball team
Georgia men's national under-20 basketball team

References

External links
Archived records of Georgia team participations

Women's national under-20 basketball teams